Winston Chapman (born April 15, 1992) is an American football long snapper who is currently a free agent. He played college football at Mississippi State.

College career
Chapman attended Mississippi State University.

Professional career
On February 22, 2017, Chapman was signed by the Miami Dolphins. He was waived on September 2, 2017.

References

1992 births
Living people
Players of American football from Alabama
American football long snappers
Mississippi State Bulldogs football players
Miami Dolphins players